Chalcides ragazzii, commonly called Ragazzi's cylindrical skink, is a species of lizard in the family Scincidae. The species is endemic to Africa.

Geographic range
C. ragazzii is found from Algeria (Ahaggar Mountains), Niger, northern Somalia and northern Kenya, to Ethiopia, Eritrea, and south-eastern Sahara.

Description
C. ragazzii is a large, pentadactyl skink (that is, it has five digits on each limb).

Reproduction
C. ragazzii is viviparous.

Etymology
The specific name, ragazzii, is in honor of the collector of the holotype, Italian physician Dr. Vincenzo Ragazzi (1856–1929) of the Modena Natural History Society.

References

Further reading
Boulenger GA (1890). "On the Varieties of Chalcides ocellatus, Forsk." Ann. Mag. Nat. Hist., Sixth Series 5: 444–445. (Chalcides ocellatus Var. Ragazzii, new variety, p. 444).

Chalcides
Skinks of Africa
Reptiles of North Africa
Vertebrates of Eritrea
Reptiles of Ethiopia
Reptiles of Kenya
Reptiles of West Africa
Reptiles of Somalia
Reptiles described in 1890
Taxa named by George Albert Boulenger